Euthrix laeta is a moth of the family Lasiocampidae first described by Francis Walker in 1855.

Distribution
It is found in South Asian countries like India, Sri Lanka, Nepal, Pakistan and Bangladesh towards Russian Far East of China, Siberia, Japan, Korea to South East Asian Sundaland.

Taxonomy
The systematics of the species has been considered taxonomically stable since a revision by Yves de Lajonquière (1977). However, by J. W. Tutt, 1902 it was accepted as a member of its own subgenus, Routlegdia, and then erroneously as the Orienthrix by Yuri A. Tschistjakov in 1998.

Description
Forewings are leaf like with an oblique postmedial yellow patch on the dorsal surface sometimes with a violet saturation. The caterpillar is known to feed on Dalbergia species. Adults are found from rainforest and coastal associations. Male has a wingspan of 33–55 mm and 50–70 mm in females. Female is much larger and more robust than the male. Antennae bipectinate (comb like on both sides) in both sexes, whereas the female has shorter rami. Body color is bright lilac reddish. Subspecies divisa in Sri Lanka is much darker. Hindwings are lightly divided with darker zones.

Body of the caterpillar is brown to ash gray. There are black and gray speckles dorsally. The white to yellow colored spots and streaks grouped to form a complete marble pattern. Mesothorax bears a dorso-median line of black setae. The caterpillar is known to feed on Lespedeza and Dalbergia species.

Subspecies
Five subspecies are recognized, along with new subspecies.

References

External links
 The complete mitochondrial genome of Euthrix laeta (Lepidoptera: Lasiocampidae)

Moths of Asia
Moths described in 1855